Cuatrociénegas  is one of the 38 municipalities of Coahuila, in north-eastern Mexico. The municipal seat lies at Cuatrociénegas de Carranza. The municipality covers an area of 7860.6 km².

As of 2005, the municipality had a total population of 12,220.

Cuatrociénegas is famous for its endemic species and has been awarded the "Pueblo Mágico" (Magic Town) category by the tourism department.

References

 
Municipalities of Coahuila